This is a list of Malaysian films produced and released in 2003. Most of the film are produced in the Malay language, but there also a significant number of films that are produced in English, Mandarin, Cantonese, Hokkien and Tamil.

2003

January – March

April – June

July – September

October – December

Unreleased

See also
2003 in Malaysia

References

External links
Malaysian film at the Internet Movie Database
Malaysian Feature Films Finas
Cinema Online Malaysia

Malaysia
2003
2003 in Malaysia